Jean-Louis Lafosse (15 March 1941 – 13 June 1981) was a French racing driver. He was most closely associated with the 24 Hours of Le Mans race, in which he finished second in 1975 and 1976.

In the European Touring Car Championship, he won the 1974 500km of Vallelunga, and the four-hour race at Monza the same year. He was runner-up in the Tourist Trophy in 1976. 

He had been provisionally entered in the 1974 Italian Grand Prix, scheduled to drive a Brabham for Scuderia Finotto alongside Carlo Facetti, but his entry was refused by the organisers.

Lafosse was killed during the 1981 24 Hours of Le Mans, when his Rondeau M379C suffered a mechanical failure on the Mulsanne Straight, veered to the right, and struck the guard rail next to a marshals' post at unabated speed, before crossing the track and striking the opposite guard rail. Two marshals were injured, but Lafosse died instantly. Lafosse' body was partially ejected and can be seen being dragged across the track with only his legs and lower body remaining in the cockpit. Photographs immediately prior to the accident showed damage to the front of Lafosse's car, with grass in the front air intake, suggesting that he had run off the track moments previously, possibly causing the damage that contributed to the fatal accident.

Racing record

Complete 24 Hours of Le Mans results

Complete Formula One World Championship results
(key)

References

1941 births
1981 deaths
French racing drivers
French Formula One drivers
European Formula Two Championship drivers
24 Hours of Le Mans drivers
Racing drivers who died while racing
World Sportscar Championship drivers
Sport deaths in France